Secretory carrier-associated membrane protein 1 is a protein that in humans is encoded by the SCAMP1 gene.

Function 

This gene product belongs to the SCAMP family of proteins which are secretory carrier membrane proteins. They function as carriers to the cell surface in post-golgi recycling pathways. Different family members are highly related products of distinct genes, and are usually expressed together. These findings suggest that the SCAMPs may function at the same site during vesicular transport rather than in separate pathways.

Interactions 

SCAMP1 has been shown to interact with ITSN1 and AP1GBP1.

References

Further reading